The 2002 Mutua Madrileña Masters Madrid was a men's tennis tournament played on indoor hard courts. It was the 1st edition of the Madrid Masters and was part of the Tennis Masters Series of the 2002 ATP Tour. It took place at the Madrid Arena in Madrid, Spain from 14 October through 20 October 2002. Second-seeded Andre Agassi won the singles title.

Finals

Singles

 Andre Agassi defeated  Jiří Novák by walkover
 It was Agassi's 5th title of the year and the 55th of his career. It was his 3rd Masters Series title of the year and his 15th overall.

Doubles

 Mark Knowles /  Daniel Nestor defeated  Mahesh Bhupathi /  Max Mirnyi 6–3, 7–5, 6–0
 It was Knowles' 7th title of the year and the 24th of his career. It was Nestor's 6th title of the year and the 26th of his career.

External links
 Official website
 ATP tournament profile

 

 
2002 ATP Tour
2002 in Spanish tennis